Sir John Tweedy (21 May 1849 – 1924) was a surgeon and a Fellow of the Royal College of Surgeons.

He was born at Stockton-on-Tees, the son of John Tweedy, a wholesale fruiterer. (Other sources say he was the son of a solicitor.) He was educated at Stockton Collegiate School under Charles James Cooke and then at Elmfield College for a period of two years and 9 months where he received a good classical and mathematical education. He read classical Greek and Latin.

He then went to University College, London and University College Hospital to study medicine. He qualified in 1872, and in 1873 became a Clinical Assistant at the Royal London Ophthalmic Hospital, Moorfields, beginning a long association with the institution. He was elected Assistant Surgeon in 1884 and later full Surgeon.

In March 1872 he took LRCP and took an editorial post at The Lancet for a period of 12 years. In 1876 he was elected a Fellow of the Royal College of Surgeons

In 1881 he also became Assistant Ophthalmic Surgeon at University College, London and Professor of Ophthalmic Medicine and Surgery in 1886. On his retirement he was elected Emeritus Professor of Ophthalmology at the College and Consulting Surgeon to the Hospital.

In 1905 he gave the Hunterian oration at the Royal College of Surgeons and in his later years was one of the Hunterian Collection trustees. In 1905 he was awarded an honorary fellowship of the Royal College of Surgeons of Edinburgh during the College's 400th anniversary celebrations.

He married Mary Hilhouse, daughter of Richard Hilhouse and had a daughter and 2 sons, Roger and Wharton.

 1892 – Member of the council of the Royal College of Surgeons
 1899 – Junior Vice-President
 1902 – Senior Vice-President
 1903 – President of the Ophthalmological Society of the United Kingdom
 1903-5 – President of the Royal College of Surgeons
 1904 – Representative of the College of Surgeons on the Courts of Governors of the Universities of Sheffield and Liverpool
 1906 – Received knighthood and an LLD from the University of Edinburgh
 1919– Published 2 essays 'The Medical Tradition' 1919 and 'The Surgical Tradition'

References

British surgeons
Fellows of the Royal College of Surgeons
1849 births
1924 deaths